A gold standard is monetary standard under which the basic unit of currency is equal in value to and exchangeable for a specified amount of gold.

Gold standard may also refer to:
 Gold Standard issue, a definitive series of postage stamps issued by the Soviet Union between 1923 and 1927
 Gold standard (test), a diagnostic test that is the best available under reasonable conditions 
 Gold Standard (carbon offset standard), a widely accepted standard for evaluating the value of carbon offsets
 Gold Standard Laboratories, a record label
 "Gold Standard", nickname of professional wrestler Shelton Benjamin
 The Gold Standard, the title of an episode of the television show NCIS: Los Angeles.